Ek Thi Larki (Hindi: एक थी लड़की, There Was A Girl) is a 1949 Hindi action comedy film by director Roop K. Shorey. It had the famous Punjabi song "Laara Lappa Laara Lappa Layi Rakhda" by Lata Mangeshkar, G. M. Durrani and Mohammad Rafi. The music director was Vinod, with lyrics by Aziz Kashmiri and story by I. S. Johar. The film starred Meena Shorey (as Meena) who became famously known as the "Larra Lappa" girl following the release of the film, and Motilal (as Ranjeet). Other co-stars were Bharat Bhushan, I. S. Johar, Agha, Shakuntala, and Kuldip Kaur.

Plot
The movie is based on Meena (Meena Shorey) who is running away from two men, who are blackmailing her for a crime she did not commit. Along the way she meets Ranjeet (Motilal), who is engaged to be married to the daughter of his boss but falls in love with Meena.

Cast
 Meena as Meena
 Motilal as Ranjeet
 Kuldeep
 Majnu as Mohan 
 Johar as Sohan
 Shakuntala
 Satish Batra
 Sham Lal as Seth Shyam Sunder
 Moti Bina
 Agha Miraj

References

External links 
 
 Ek Thi Larki (1949) on YouTube

1940s Hindi-language films
1949 films
Films scored by Vinod
Indian black-and-white films
Indian action comedy films
1940s action comedy films
1949 comedy films